Notogomphus is a genus of dragonflies in the family Gomphidae, containing the following species:

Notogomphus anaci
Notogomphus butoloensis
Notogomphus cottarellii
Notogomphus dendrohyrax
Notogomphus dorsalis
Notogomphus flavifrons
Notogomphus kilimandjaricus
Notogomphus lecythus
Notogomphus leroyi
Notogomphus lujai
Notogomphus maathaiae
Notogomphus maryae
Notogomphus meruensis
Notogomphus moorei
Notogomphus praetorius
Notogomphus ruppeli
Notogomphus speciosus
Notogomphus spinosus
Notogomphus verschuereni
Notogomphus zernyi

References 

Gomphidae
Anisoptera genera
Taxa named by Edmond de Sélys Longchamps
Taxonomy articles created by Polbot